Manning Clark North is a light rail station in Australia on the Canberra Metro R1 Civic to Gungahlin line, located at the intersection of Flemington Road and the western end of Manning Clark Crescent. The station serves the eastern part of the Gungahlin Town Centre as well as the adjacent suburbs of Franklin and Harrison. At the time of opening, much of the land surrounding the station was undeveloped. Bicycle racks and "kiss and ride" bay are provided on Flemington Road close to the station. At the time of opening, much of the land surrounding the station was undeveloped.

Light rail services
All services in both directions stop at the station. There is no interchange with ACTION bus routes here, although some local services stop on The Valley Avenue, a 300m walk.

References

Light rail stations in Canberra
Railway stations in Australia opened in 2019